Konče (Turkish Konçe) is a village in North Macedonia. It is the seat of Konče Municipality.

Demographics
According to the 2002 census, the village had a total of 967 inhabitants. Ethnic groups in the village include:

Macedonians 444
Turks 521
Others 2

Sports
The local football team is FK Birlik.

Notable people
Kantakuzina Katarina Branković (1419-1492), Serbian princess

References

Villages in Konče Municipality
Turkish communities in North Macedonia